Port of Seven Seas is a 1938 drama film starring Wallace Beery and featuring Frank Morgan and Maureen O'Sullivan.  The movie was written by Preston Sturges based on the plays of Marcel Pagnol and the films based on them, and was directed by James Whale, the director of Frankenstein (1931) and The Invisible Man (1933). The cinematography is by Karl Freund, who filmed Fritz Lang's Metropolis (1927) and I Love Lucy (1951-1957).

Plot
TCM Synopsis:
In the port of Marseilles, France, Honore Panisse, a well-to-do sailmaker in his fifties, is enamored of the lovely Madelon, the daughter of a widowed fishmonger. For many years Panisse has played cards with Bruneau, Captain Escartefigue and tavern-owner Cesar, the father of Marius, the boy with whom Madelon is in love. Though Cesar and Marius are great friends, they argue constantly, especially over Panisse's infatuation with Madelon, whom Cesar considers one of the family. One day, Marius sends Madelon a note saying that he is going to sea for three years, but cannot say goodbye in person because it would break his heart. Madelon rushes to the docks and faints as his ship sails away. Because Panisse has just arrived, he tries to carry her home, but Cesar insists on taking her himself, not realizing that Marius has gone. Panisse tries to tell him why she fainted, but cannot, and listens fretfully as Cesar tells him that the two young people will soon be married. When he tells Madelon's mother Honorine this, Madelon, now revived, tells them that Marius has gone. Despite her love, she did not stop him because she knew how much he loved the sea. One month later, As Cesar pretends not to care that Marius has not written, the postman arrives with a letter from the boy. When Madelon arrives he reads the letter aloud, saddening Madelon, who is barely mentioned. Soon Panisse goes to Honorine to ask once again for the hand of Madelon. At the same time, Madelon finds out that she is pregnant and prays that she will have the strength to tell her mother. Madelon later goes to Panisse and tells him why she cannot marry him, but he is overjoyed with the news of her pregnancy because he has always wanted a son and his late wife was never able to bear a child. Because Panisse is so kind, Madelon agrees to marry him for the sake of the little one, and when Cesar arrives, quells his anger by telling him the truth. Cesar finally relents in his anger at Panissse for "stealing" his grandchild when Panisse says that he will make Cesar the godfather. They agree to call the boy Cesar Marius Panisse. After the baby is born, he is the apple of Panisse's eye, and Madelon gains the gratitude of Panisse's aged relatives, as well as the continued devotion of Panisse. One year later, just after Panisse has reluctantly boarded the train to go to Paris on business, Marius unexpectedly shows up at his father's house, returned to France to obtain some equipment for his ship. During the night, Marius goes to see Madelon, knowing that she has married Panisse, and Madelon lies to him, saying that Panisse is asleep. Marius confesses how much he has missed her, but she tells him it's too late. When the baby cries, she goes to him and Marius realizes that the child is his. When she tearfully confesses that Panisse is actually in Paris, Marius asks her to come away with him, but she tells him to go away. Just then Cesar comes back. He has returned home because he ran into the town doctor on the train and learned that a neighbor's child has contracted scarlet fever. He tells Marius to go away because that the baby now belongs to Panisse. She wants to go away with him and the baby, but just as they are talking, Panisse comes home because he was worried about the baby. Soon Cesar arrives also and tells Marius to go, but he refuses to leave without Madelon and the baby. Though Panisse sadly says that Madelon can have her freedom, he adds that he cannot give the baby up. When Panisse goes to check on the baby, Madelon and Cesar make Marius realize that the baby belongs as much to Panisse as Marius or Madelon. When Panisse returns, Marius shakes his hand and goes away, after which Panisse and Madelon happily look at their baby's first tooth.

In the French port of Marseille, a lovely young woman named Madelon is in love with a young sailor, Marius. Madelon in turn is loved by Honore Panisse, a well-to-do middle-aged sailmaker.  When Marius finds out he must go to sea for three years, he leaves without saying goodbye to Madelon; in a note he tells her that it would break his heart to tell her in person.  She rushes to the dock, but sees his ship sailing away and faints.  Marius's father Cesar, who already thinks of Madelon as one of the family, carries her to her home.

Later, Madelon finds out that she is pregnant, and to spare her the shame of a child born out of wedlock, Panisse asks Madelon to get an abortion. She agrees, and goes to find a rusty clotheshanger. She proceeds with her attempt to kill her fetus. She did not succeed, and was rushed to the hospital bleeding.

A year later Marius unexpectedly returns from sea to buy some equipment for his ship.  Visiting Madelon that night, he sees the baby and realizes that he is the father. He asks her to steal away with him, but she refuses. Despite her love for Marius, she knows that Panisse, who adores the child, will be a better father than Marius, who will be away at sea for many years at a time.  Marius leaves, shaking Panisse's hand before he goes, and Panisse and Madelon happily look at their baby's first tooth.

Cast
 Wallace Beery as Cesar
 Frank Morgan as Panisse
 Maureen O'Sullivan as Madelon
 John Beal as Marius
 Jessie Ralph as Honorine
 Cora Witherspoon as Claudine
 Etienne Girardot as Bruneau
 E. Alyn Warren as Captain Escartefigue
 Jerry Colonna as Arab Rug Dealer (uncredited)
 Henry Hull as Uncle Alzear (uncredited)
 Doris Lloyd as Customer (uncredited)
 Fred Malatesta as Bird Seller (uncredited)
 Robert Spindola as Boy (uncredited)

Production
Although the credited basis of Port of Seven Seas was Marcel Pagnol's 1931 play Fanny, the screenplay incorporated some incidents from three French films written by Pagnol based on his plays: Marius (1931), directed by Alexander Korda, Fanny (1932), directed by Marc Allégret, and César (1936), which Pagnol directed. The play "Marius" was a great success and was played more than one thousand times in Paris.

William Wyler was slated to direct the film at the time that Preston Sturges was brought into the project, the working titles for which were "Fanny", "Madelon", "Life on the Waterfront" and "Man of the Waterfront".  Ernest Vajda had been reported to be one of the screenwriters, but was not credited.  The project was considered by Universal Studios in late 1933 or early 1934, but was dropped sometime after Joseph Breen, who supervised the Production Code, rejected the submitted script. Paramount Pictures had some interest in it, before the script ended up at MGM by July 1936. Although the MGM script was still essentially the one that Universal had submitted to the Hays Office, this time the censors found it "acceptable", and it was approved on 15 March 1938.  This did not prevent the Legion of Decency from protesting that the film "lower[ed] the standards" that the Production Code was designed to uphold.

Port of Seven Seas was in production from late December 1937 through 28 January 1938, with retakes completed on 23 February.  Shortly before production started, Luise Rainer, who was to have played "Madelon" was replaced by Maureen O'Sullivan because of a bad cold.

The film was released on 1 July 1938, the long delay coming about because the studio considered the subject matter "dangerous" for the film industry while Congress was considering legislation which had implications for film censorship.

The movie was premiered on July 1, 1938 in New York City. Marcel Pagnol and Raimu (the great French actor who played Cesar in the French plays and movies) were invited but did not come, supposedly for fear of air travel. The movie was premiered in France in Marseille, later in 1938, at the movie theatre "Le Noailles" with Wallace Beery, Marcel Pagnol and Raimu in attendance.

Other versions
Pagnol's plays provided source material for the three French films noted above, a 1933 Italian film named Fanny, the 1934 German film Der Schwarze Walfisch ("The Black Whale"), the 1954 Broadway musical Fanny, and the 1961 non-musical film based in part on it.  Even though many situations and incidents in the 1961 film originated in Port of the Seven Seas, neither it nor Preston Sturges was credited.

Notes

External links
 
 
 

1938 films
1938 drama films
American drama films
American black-and-white films
Films scored by Franz Waxman
Films directed by James Whale
American films based on plays
Films based on works by Marcel Pagnol
Films set in Marseille
Metro-Goldwyn-Mayer films
Films with screenplays by Preston Sturges
1930s English-language films
1930s American films